Hal Faverty is a former player in the National Football League.

Biography
Faverty was born Harold Edward Faverty on September 26, 1927 in Hammond, Indiana.

Career
Faverty was drafted in the fifteenth round of the 1949 NFL Draft by the Chicago Bears and would later play with the Green Bay Packers during the 1952 NFL season. He played at the collegiate level at the University of Wisconsin-Madison, where he was a member of the All-America team and is an inductee in the University's Athletics Hall of Fame.

See also
List of Green Bay Packers players

References

1927 births
Living people
Sportspeople from Hammond, Indiana
Green Bay Packers players
Wisconsin Badgers football players
All-American college football players
Sportspeople from the Chicago metropolitan area
Players of American football from Indiana